11441 Anadiego, provisional designation , is a stony background asteroid from the central region of the asteroid belt, approximately 7 kilometers in diameter. It was discovered on 31 December 1975, by Argentine astronomer Mario R. Cesco at the El Leoncito Complex in western Argentina. It was named in memory of Argentine political activist Ana Diego.

Orbit and classification 

Anadiego orbits the Sun in the central main-belt at a distance of 1.9–3.2 AU once every 4 years and 1 month (1,498 days). Its orbit has an eccentricity of 0.26 and an inclination of 12° with respect to the ecliptic.
As no precoveries were taken, the asteroid's observation arc starts with its discovery observation in 1975.

Physical characteristics 

Anadiego has been characterized as a common S-type asteroid by Pan-STARRS photometric survey.

Rotation period 

A rotational lightcurve was obtained for this asteroid by astronomer Kevin Hills at the Australian Riverland Dingo Observatory in February 2013. It gave a rotation period of  hours with a brightness variation of 0.11 magnitude.

Diameter and albedo 

According to the surveys carried out by NASA's Wide-field Infrared Survey Explorer with its subsequent NEOWISE mission, Anadiego measures 6.8 and 7.3 kilometers in diameter and its surface has an albedo of 0.287 and 0.254, respectively. The Collaborative Asteroid Lightcurve Link assumes a lower standard albedo for stony asteroids of 0.20, and, correspondingly calculates a larger diameter of 8.2 kilometers with an absolute magnitude of 12.8.

Naming 

This minor planet was named in memory of Ana Teresa Diego (1954–1976), an astronomy student at La Plata Astronomical Observatory and political activist, who was kidnapped and disappeared in September 1976, by unidentified persons believed working for the military junta then ruling Argentina. The approved naming citation was published by the Minor Planet Center 10 December 2011.

References

External links 
  
 Asteroid Lightcurve Database (LCDB), query form (info )
 Dictionary of Minor Planet Names, Google books
 Asteroids and comets rotation curves, CdR – Observatoire de Genève, Raoul Behrend
 Discovery Circumstances: Numbered Minor Planets (10001)-(15000) – Minor Planet Center
 
 

011441
Discoveries by Mario R. Cesco
Named minor planets
19751231